Bistorta bistortoides (American bistort, western bistort, smokeweed, mountain meadow knotweed, mountain buckwheat or mountain meadow buckwheat) is a perennial herb in the buckwheat and knotweed family  Polygonaceae. The species name remains unresolved.

Bistorta bistortoides is distributed throughout the Mountain West in North America from Alaska and British Columbia south into California and east into the Rocky Mountains.

Bistorta bistortoides grows from foothills to above the timberline, although plants growing above 7,500 feet (2250 m) are smaller and seldom reach more than 12 inches (30 cm) in height. Plants in other areas may reach over half a meter–1.5 feet (20–60 cm) tall. The leaves are leathery and up to 40 centimeters (3 feet) long, and are mostly basal on the stem. The dense cylindrical to oblong inflorescence is packed with small white to pinkish flowers, each a few millimeters wide and with protruding stamens. Rodents and bears consume the roots, and elk and deer browse the foliage.

American bistort was an important food plant used by Native Americans living in the Mountain West, including Blackfoot and Cheyenne peoples. The roots are edible either raw or fire-roasted with a flavor resembling chestnuts.  The seeds can be dried and ground into flour and used to make bread. They were also roasted and eaten as a cracked grain. The young leaves can be eaten raw or cooked.

References

External links

Jepson Manual Treatment – Polygonum bistortoides
United States Department of Agriculture Plants Profile
Polygonum bistortoides – Callphotos Photo gallery, University of California

bistortoides
Plants described in 1813
Natural history of the California chaparral and woodlands
Flora of Western Canada
Flora of the Northwestern United States
Flora of the Southwestern United States
Flora of the South-Central United States
Plants used in Native American cuisine
Flora without expected TNC conservation status